The Marina district is a neighborhood in the southwest section of Downtown San Diego, California along the San Diego Bay.

Geography

The district is bordered to the north by the Columbia district, bordered to east/southeast by the Gaslamp Quarter, and is bordered to the southwest by the San Diego Marina.

This district used to be full of warehouses and vacant lots, but now it houses mid-rise and high-rise hotels, apartments, condominiums, medical offices and retail. Seaport Village and the San Diego Convention Center are located in this neighborhood. Pantoja Park, the oldest park in San Diego, is located in the Marina District.

See also
Navy Broadway Complex
North Embarcadero Visionary Plan

References

External links
Downtown Neighborhoods Map
ArtWalk on the Bay at Marina Park
Information on Marina Neighborhood

Neighborhoods in San Diego
Urban communities in San Diego
San Diego Bay
Warehouse districts of the United States
Economy of San Diego